The Hockey East Best Defensive Forward is an annual award given out at the conclusion of the Hockey East regular season to the best defensive forward in the conference as voted by the head coaches of each Hockey East team. It was shared for the first time in the 2013–14 season, between Bill Arnold of Boston College and Ross Mauermann of Providence.

The Best Defensive Forward was first bestowed in 1997 and every year thereafter.

Award winners

Winners by school

Winners by position

See also
Hockey East Awards

References

General

Specific

External links
Hockey East Awards (Incomplete)

College ice hockey trophies and awards in the United States